Rear Admiral Clarence Wade McClusky, Jr., (June 1, 1902 – June 27, 1976) was a United States Navy aviator during World War II and the early Cold War period. He is credited with having played a major part in the Battle of Midway. In the words of Admiral Chester Nimitz, McClusky's decision to continue the search for the enemy and his judgment as to where the enemy might be found, "decided the fate of our carrier task force and our forces at Midway".

Early life
McClusky was born in Buffalo, New York. He was the second of five children to Clarence Wade McClusky, Sr., an accountant, and Mary Anastasia Stears "May" McClusky. Both of his parents were born in Pennsylvania, but had spent their adulthoods in Buffalo. Wade, Sr. was a Presbyterian of Scotch-Irish ancestry, while May was an Irish Catholic. Wade, Sr. refused to raise the children in the Catholic faith, and forbade May from attending Catholic Mass. Wade, Sr. died in an automobile crash on October 8, 1928, after which May returned to the Catholic Church. May persuaded one of McClusky's sisters to convert to Catholicism, but McClusky himself became an Episcopalian. 

McClusky disliked his first name Clarence, and always signed his name as "C. Wade McClusky". He attended South Park High School in Buffalo, where he was a clever and hard-working student. McClusky graduated in 1918 at the age of 16. As his family's financial situation was strained, he sought employment instead of applying to colleges. His first job involved cleaning the interiors of railroad tanker cars, and associated exposure to various chemicals. McClusky's son Philip recalled in 2015: "He told me once that it was a miserable job and as a result he was determined to go to college or the academy!"

Naval aviator and instructor
McClusky graduated from the United States Naval Academy in 1926, the same class as Max Leslie, Carlton Hutchins, and Lofton R. Henderson; and became a Naval Aviator three years later. Over the next decade, he served in several air units, as well as on command staff, as an instructor at the Naval Academy and at shore facilities.

World War II
Lieutenant Commander McClusky became Enterprise'''s air group commander in April 1942.

When McClusky could not find the Japanese carriers where he expected them, and with his air group's fuel running dangerously low, he began a box search and on the second leg spotted the  steaming north at flank speed. Arashi had stayed behind to attack the submarine , which had been harassing the Japanese fleet. Surmising that Arashi must be following the main fleet, McClusky ordered a change in course in the same direction as Arashi. This led him directly to the enemy carriers. 

McClusky gave the order to attack, which resulted in confusion, with both squadrons of 31 aircraft diving on the closer carrier, Kaga. Doctrine called for McClusky's forward squadron to attack the more distant carrier, Akagi, and the squadron behind his to attack Kaga. Two simultaneous carrier attacks would have made it harder for Japanese Zeros to respond. Lieutenant Richard Best, who commanded the other squadron and was considered to be its best pilot, noticed the error and pulled out with two wingmen to attack Akagi, with Best scoring a direct hit amidships and a wingman a near miss which disabled the rudder and rendered Akagi immobile. The other 28 dive bombers, some of which nearly collided with each other, scored at least four hits on Kaga, leaving it a burning wreck. As he pulled out of his dive, McClusky's plane was pounced on by two Zeros, which put 52 holes in his plane and a bullet through his shoulder. After his gunner shot down one of the Zeros, McClusky was able to land his plane safely on Enterprise even with partially shot-up controls. 

The confused attack order was later explained as a radio error due to multiple people speaking at the same time. McClusky had been a fighter pilot prior to becoming Air Group Commander and was very familiar with dive bombing doctrine, as was Best. McClusky's decision to lead his squadron in attacking the closer Kaga was in keeping with doctrine that stated it was the commander on the scene that could make the decision as to what target to bomb.

Within minutes, three of the four Japanese carriers had been turned into burning hulks, with the Sōryū being hit by Yorktown's dive bombers. The remaining carrier of the Japanese fleet, Hiryū, was damaged six hours later. The actual sinking of all four carriers was done by torpedoes from Japanese escort ships as the Japanese were unable to move their crippled carriers and did not want them to be captured. 

McClusky, for his vital contribution to the outcome of this pivotal battle, was awarded the Navy Cross. Later in World War II, he commanded the escort carrier .

After the war
McClusky served in a variety of staff and shore positions in the later 1940s. During the Korean War, he was chief of staff to the commanders of the First and Seventh Fleets. He commanded Naval Air Station Glenview, Illinois, in 1952–53, and the Boston Group of the Atlantic Reserve Fleet in 1954–56. McClusky retired from active duty in July 1956 as a Captain but was promoted administratively to Rear Admiral. U.S. Navy policy at the time allowed officers who earned a personal award for heroism (his Navy Cross) to advance one grade upon retirement but without pay. This policy was unofficially known as a promotion to "tombstone Admiral" with the thought being the individual would have that rank inscribed on his tombstone. The policy ended in the early 1960s. Admiral McClusky's tombstone at the United States Naval Academy cemetery has his rank inscribed as Rear Admiral.

The Buffalo and Erie County Naval and Military Park has commissioned and dedicated a bronze sculpture of McClusky's likeness. It stands in the museum.

Namesakes
 was named in his honor.

The Wade McClusky Award is given annually to the most outstanding attack squadron in the US Navy.

Portrayal in media
 In the 1949 film Task Force, McClusky was portrayed by actor Bruce Bennett.
 In the 1976 film Midway, he was portrayed by actor Christopher George.
 In the 1988 TV miniseries War and Remembrance, he was portrayed by actor Earl Hindman.
 In the 2019 film Midway'', McClusky was portrayed by actor Luke Evans.

References

Sources

External links

 

1902 births
1976 deaths
American people of Irish descent
American people of Scotch-Irish descent
Battle of Midway
Burials at the United States Naval Academy Cemetery
Military personnel from Buffalo, New York
Recipients of the Distinguished Flying Cross (United States)
Recipients of the Legion of Merit
Recipients of the Navy Cross (United States)
United States Naval Academy alumni
United States Navy rear admirals
United States Navy pilots of World War II